Ribera de Arriba (Asturian: La Ribera, and both officially) is a municipality in the Autonomous Community of the Principality of Asturias, Spain. It is bordered on the north and east by Oviedo, on the south by Mieres and Morcín, and on the west by Santo Adriano. As of 2010, it has a population of 2,009.

Parishes
 Ferreros
 Palombar
 Perera
 Soto Ribera
 Teyego

References

External links
Federación Asturiana de Concejos 
Estado del Embalse de Alfilorios 

Municipalities in Asturias